Rubus chamaemorus is a species of flowering plant in the rose family Rosaceae, native to cool temperate regions, alpine and arctic tundra and boreal forest. This herbaceous perennial produces amber-colored edible fruit similar to the blackberry. English common names include cloudberry, nordic berry, bakeapple (in Newfoundland and Labrador), knotberry and knoutberry (in England), aqpik or low-bush salmonberry (in Alaska – not to be confused with salmonberry, Rubus spectabilis), and averin or evron (in Scotland).

Description

Unlike most Rubus species, the cloudberry is dioecious, and fruit production by a female plant requires pollination from a male plant.

The leaves alternate between having 5 and 7 soft, handlike lobes on straight, branchless stalks. After pollination, the white (sometimes reddish-tipped) flowers form raspberry-sized aggregate fruits which are more plentiful in wooded rather than sun-exposed habitats. Consisting of between 5 and 25 drupelets, each fruit is initially pale red, ripening into an amber color in early autumn.

Distribution and ecology

Cloudberries are a circumpolar boreal plant, occurring naturally throughout the Northern Hemisphere from 78°N, south to about 55°N, and are scattered south to 44°N mainly in mountainous areas and moorlands. In Europe, they grow in the Nordic countries but are rare in the Baltic states (Estonia, Latvia and Lithuania) and Poland. They occur across northern Russia east towards the Pacific Ocean as far south as Japan in the island of Hokkaido. Due to peatland drainage and peat exploitation, they are considered endangered and are under legal protection in Germany's Weser and Elbe valleys, and at isolated sites in the English Pennines and Scottish Highlands. A single, fragile site exists in the Sperrin Mountains of Northern Ireland.

In North America, cloudberries grow wild across Greenland, most of northern Canada, Alaska, northern Minnesota, New Hampshire, Maine, and New York.

Wide distribution occurs due to the excretion of the indigestible seeds by birds and mammals. Cuttings of these taken in May or August are successful in producing a genetic clone of the parent plant.

Cloudberry leaves are food for caterpillars of several Lepidoptera species. The moth Coleophora thulea has no other known food plants. See also List of Lepidoptera that feed on Rubus.

Cultivation

Despite great demand as a delicacy (particularly in Sweden, Norway and Finland) the cloudberry is not widely cultivated and is primarily a wild plant. Wholesale prices vary widely based on the size of the yearly harvest, but cloudberries have gone for as little as €10/kg (in 2004).

Since the middle of the 1990s, however, the species has formed part of a multinational research project. Beginning in 2002, selected cultivars have been available to farmers, notably 'Apolto' (male), 'Fjellgull' (female) and 'Fjordgull' (female). The cloudberry can be cultivated in Arctic areas where few other crops are possible, for example along the northern coast of Norway.

Uses

When ripe, cloudberry fruits are golden-yellow, soft and juicy, and are rich in vitamin C. When eaten fresh, cloudberries have a distinctive tart taste. When over-ripe, they have a creamy texture somewhat like yogurt and a sweet flavor. They are often made into jams, juices, tarts, and liqueurs. In Finland, the berries are eaten with heated  (a local cheese; the name translates to "bread-cheese"), as well as cream and sugar. In Sweden, cloudberries and cloudberry jam are used as a topping for ice cream, pancakes, and waffles. In Norway, they are often mixed with whipped cream and sugar to be served as a dessert called  (cloudberry cream), as a jam or as an ingredient in homemade ice cream. Cloudberry yoghurt— or —is a supermarket item in Norway.

In Newfoundland and Labrador, Canada, cloudberries are used to make "bakeapple pie" or jam. Arctic Yup'ik mix the berries with seal oil, reindeer or caribou fat (which is diced and made fluffy with seal oil) and sugar to make "Eskimo ice cream" or akutaq. The recipes vary by region. Along the Yukon and Kuskokwim River areas, white fish (pike) along with shortening and sugar are used. The berries are an important traditional food resource for the Yup'ik.

Due to its high vitamin C content, the berry is valued both by Nordic seafarers and Northern indigenous peoples. Its polyphenol content, including flavonoid compounds such as ellagic acid, appears to naturally preserve food preparations of the berries. Cloudberries can be preserved in their own juice without added sugar, if stored cool.

Extract of cloudberries is also used in cosmetics such as shower gels, hand creams and body lotions.

Alcoholic drinks
Cloudberry is used as a flavouring for making akvavit.

Nutrients and phytochemicals
Cloudberries are rich in vitamin C and ellagic acid, citric acid, malic acid, α-tocopherol, anthocyanins and the provitamin A carotenoid, β-carotene in contents which differ across regions of Finland due to sunlight exposure, rainfall or temperature. The ellagitannins lambertianin C and sanguiin H-6 are also present. Genotype of cloudberry variants may also affect polyphenol composition, particularly for ellagitannins, sanguiin H-6, anthocyanins and quercetin.

Polyphenol extracts from cloudberries have improved storage properties when microencapsulated using maltodextrin DE5-8. At least 14 volatile compounds, including vanillin, account for the aroma of cloudberries.

Cultural references

The cloudberry appears on the Finnish version of the 2 euro coin. The name of the hill  in Breadalbane in the Scottish Highlands means "Hill of the Cloudberries" in Scottish Gaelic. Transactions of Camden's Britain (1637 edition) indicates the etymological origins of 'cloud-berry', the plant's name in old Lancashire dialect: 'Pendelhill [in Lancashire] advenceth itselfe up the skie [...] and in the very top thereof bringeth forth a peculiar plant which, as though it came out of the clowdes, they tearme clowdes-berry'. In Norrland cloudberries are known as Norrland's gold.

One of the gnomes in The Little Grey Men, a 1942 children's book by "BB" (Denys Watkins-Pitchford), and its sequel is named Cloudberry.

Harvesting on public property

In some northern European countries such as Norway, a common use policy to non-wood forest products allows anyone to pick cloudberries on public property and eat them on location, but only local residents may transport them from that location and only ripe berries may be picked. Transporting ripe cloudberries from the harvest location is permitted in many counties.

It was illegal to harvest unripe cloudberries in Norway between 1970 and 2004. Many people still believe that it's illegal to harvest unripe cloudberries in Norway, but the law has been made defunct.

Gallery

References

Further reading

External links

chamaemorus
Berries
Flora of Europe
Flora of North America
Flora of temperate Asia
Finnish cuisine
Inuit cuisine
Canadian cuisine
Norwegian cuisine
Swedish cuisine
Plants described in 1753
Taxa named by Carl Linnaeus
Dioecious plants